Tone Partljič (born 5 August 1940) is a Slovene writer, playwright and politician. Between 1990 and 2004 he was a member of the Slovenian National Assembly, from 1994 as a member of the LDS party. He was also president of the Slovene Writers' Association between 1983 and 1987.

Partljič was born in Maribor and grew up in Pesnica pri Mariboru. He studied in Maribor and graduated in Slovene and English language in 1965 and worked as a teacher and then as a dramaturge and artistic director at the Slovene National Theatre and the Ljubljana City Theatre. In 1980 he won the Prešeren Foundation Award for his satirical comedies. In 2016, he was given the Prešeren Award, the highest Slovenian award in the field of artistic creation, for lifetime achievement.

Published works

Plays 
 Ribe na plitvini, (1968)
 Naj poje čuk, (1971)
 Tolmun in kamen, (1972)
 Ščuke pa ni, (1973)
 Oskubite jastreba, (1977)
 Nekoč in danes,(1979)
 Za koga naj še molim?,(1980)
 Taki ste, take smo, (1980)
 Nasvidenje nad zvezdami,(1981)
 O, ne, ščuke pa ne, (1982)
 Moj ata, socialistični kulak, (1983)
 Sekretar za humor, (1984)
 Rdeče in sinje med drevjem, (1985)
 Justifikacija, Mestno gledališče ljubljansko, (1986)
 Ščuka, da te kap, (1987)
 Pesnikova žena prihaja, (1989)
 Deni me kot pečat na svoje srce, (1990)
 Moj deda, socialistični mrtvak, (1991)
 Štajerc v Ljubljani, (1995)
 Politika, bolezen moja, (1996)
 Gospa poslančeva, (1996)
 Komedije, (1997)
 Maister in Marjeta, (1998)
 Čistilka Marija, (1998)
 En dan resnice, (1999)
 Krivica boli, (1999)
 Čaj za dve, (2001)
 Edelweis ali Denis in Ditka, (2001)
 Izbrane komedije, (2003)
 Poroka čistilke Marije, (2006)
 Zveze in partnerstva, (2007)
 Za nacionalni interes, (2007)

Prose
 Ne glej za pticami, (1967)
 Jalovost, (1971)
 Volk na madridskih ulicah, (1974)
 Nasvidenje nad zvezdami, (1982)
 Pepsi ali provincialni donjuan, (1987)
 Rdeče in sinje med drevjem, (1987)
 Kulturne humoreske, prosim, (1988)
 Prelesti, prelesti, Mladinska knjiga, (1990)
 Goool!: predvolilne humoreske, (1992)
 Mala, Prešernova družba, (1992)
 Pri Mariji Snežni zvoni, (1994)
 Starec za plotom, (1995)
 Samo roko daj, (1997)
 Pisatelj v parlamentu, (1998)
 Usodna privlačnost, (2001)
 Kampanja, (2002)
 Golaž, reka in mostovi, (2003)
 Grob pri Mariji Snežni, (2005)

Youth literature
Hotel sem prijeti sonce, (1981)
Slišal sem, kako trava raste, (1990)
Dupleška mornarica, (1996)
Maša in Tjaša, (1999)
General: deset črtic o Rudolfu Maistru, (2006)

Television
''Ščuke pa ni, ščuke pa ne (1980), Slovenian television comedy series

References

1940 births
Living people
Slovenian dramatists and playwrights
Writers from Maribor
Members of the National Assembly (Slovenia)
Presidents of the Slovene Writers' Association
Levstik Award laureates
Politicians from Maribor
Prešeren Award laureates
Comedy writers
Liberal Democracy of Slovenia politicians